Grand Cape Mount-2 is an electoral district for the elections to the House of Representatives of Liberia. The constituency covers Robertsport City, Garwula District, the Jenne Brown community of Gola Konneh District and Mandoe and Sembehum communities of the Robertsport Commonwealth District.

Elected representatives

References

Electoral districts in Liberia